Joanna Trzepiecińska (born 7 September 1965 in Tomaszów Mazowiecki, Poland) is a Polish film, television and theater actress, best known for playing in the Polish TV series Rodzina zastępcza (Foster Family).

Filmography

Actress 
 1987 Rzeka kłamstwa as Joanna Macieszanka
 1988 Dotknięci as Wanda Milewska
 1989 Czarny wąwóz as Lotka
 1989 Stan strachu as Iwona
 1989 Sztuka kochania as Anna
 1990 Kanalia as Tamara
 1990 Powrót wilczycy as Iza Ziębalska
 1990 W środku Europy as Bożena
 1991 Nad rzeką, której nie ma as Marta
 1991 Obywatel świata as Joasia
 1991 Panny i wdowy as Karolina
 1991 Papierowe małżeństwo (Paper Marriage) as Alicja Strzałkowska
 1993 Balanga as Kobieta
 1993 Do widzenia wczoraj. Dwie krótkie komedie o zmianie systemu as Mama Zosi
 1993 Łowca. Ostatnie starcie as Parvina
 1994 Molly as Kasia
 1994 Blood of the Innocent as Anna 
 1995 Dzieje mistrza Twardowskiego as Ghost of Barbara Radziwiłłówna
 1995 Prowokator as Anna Kawielin
 1996 Bar Atlantic as Hanka Rupcuś-Gąsienica
 2000–2005 Plebania as Anna Stajniak
 2000–2009 Rodzina zastępcza/Rodzina zastępcza plus (Foster Family / Foster Family and Others) as Alutka Kossoń
 2002 Na dobre i na złe as Renata Zawadzka
 2005 Anioł Stróż as Anna Górska
 2006–2007 Pogoda na piątek as Jola
 2008–2011 Barwy szczęścia as Renata
 2008 I kto tu rządzi? as Anka
 2014 Na Wspólnej as Betty Sulinsky, Nicole's Mother

Dubbing in Polish
 1997 Anastasia as Anya / Anastasia
 2000 The Miracle Maker as Mary Magdalene
 2000 The Adventures of Rocky and Bullwinkle as Natasha Fatale
 2003 Finding Nemo as Dory
 2003 Exploring the Reef as Dory
 2004 Shark Tale as Angie
 2005 Robots as Cappy
 2007 Bee Movie as Vanessa
 2008 Beverly Hills Chihuahua as Aunt Wanda

External links 

Official profile in Filmpolski.pl database

1965 births
Polish film actresses
Polish television actresses
People from Tomaszów Mazowiecki
Polish stage actresses
20th-century Polish actresses
Polish voice actresses
Living people